Alton Harry Mort (24 March 1906 – 23 December 1981) was an  Australian rules footballer who played with Hawthorn in the Victorian Football League (VFL).

He later served in the RAAF in World War II.

His son, Ian Mort played with Hawthorn between 1960 and 1964.

Notes

External links 

1906 births
1981 deaths
Australian rules footballers from Victoria (Australia)
Hawthorn Football Club players
Royal Australian Air Force personnel of World War II
Australian rules footballers from Adelaide